The McDonnell Aircraft Corporation was an American aerospace manufacturer based in St. Louis, Missouri. The company was founded on July 6, 1939, by James Smith McDonnell, and was best known for its military fighters, including the F-4 Phantom II, and crewed spacecraft including the Mercury capsule and Gemini capsule. McDonnell Aircraft later merged with the Douglas Aircraft Company to form McDonnell Douglas in 1967.

History
James McDonnell founded J.S. McDonnell & Associates in Milwaukee, Wisconsin, in 1928 to produce a small aircraft for family use. The economic depression from 1929 ruined his plans and the company collapsed. He went to work for Glenn L. Martin.

He left in 1938 to try again with his own firm, McDonnell Aircraft Corporation, based at St. Louis, Missouri in 1939. World War II was a major boost to the new company. It grew from 15 employees in 1939 to 5,000 at the end of the war and became a significant aircraft parts producer, and developed the XP-67 Bat fighter prototype. McDonnell also developed the LBD-1 Gargoyle guided missile. McDonnell Aircraft suffered after the war with an end of government orders and a surplus of aircraft, and heavily cut its workforce. The advent of the Korean War helped push McDonnell into a major military fighter supply role.

In 1943, McDonnell began developing jets when they were invited to bid in a US Navy contest and eventually built the successful FH-1 Phantom in the postwar era. The Phantom introduced McDonnell's telltale design with engines placed forward under the fuselage and exiting just behind the wing, a layout that was used successfully on the F2H Banshee, F3H Demon, and the F-101 Voodoo. David S. Lewis joined the company as Chief of Aerodynamics in 1946. He led the development of the legendary F-4 Phantom II in 1954, which was introduced into service in 1960. Lewis became Executive Vice President in 1958, and finally became President and Chief Operating Officer in 1962. 

McDonnell made a number of missiles, including the pioneering Gargoyle and unusual ADM-20 Quail, as well as experimenting with hypersonic flight, research that enabled them to gain a substantial share of the NASA projects Mercury and Gemini. The success of the Mercury capsule led the company adopted a new logo features the capsule circling a globe with the motto "First Free Man in Space". The company was now a major employer, but was having problems. It had almost no civilian business, and was thus vulnerable to any peacetime downturn in procurement.

Meanwhile, Douglas Aircraft was reeling from cash flow problems and development costs. It was also having a hard time meeting demand. The two companies began sounding each other out about a merger in 1963. On paper, they were a good match. Douglas' civilian business would have been more than enough to allow McDonnell to withstand any downturns in military procurement, while the cash flow from McDonnell's military contracts would have given Douglas badly-needed security. Douglas formally accepted McDonnell's offer in December 1966, and the two firms officially merged on April 28, 1967, as the McDonnell Douglas Corporation (MDC). Soon after the merger was announced, McDonnell bought 1.5 million shares of Douglas stock to help Douglas meet "immediate financial requirements". McDonnell management dominated the merged company. It was based at McDonnell's facility in St. Louis, with James McDonnell as chairman and CEO. In 1967, with the merger of McDonnell and Douglas Aircraft, David Lewis, then president of McDonnell, was named chairman of what was called the Douglas Aircraft Division. After managing the turnaround of the division, he returned to St. Louis in 1969 as president of McDonnell Douglas.

McDonnell Douglas later merged with Boeing in August 1997. Boeing's defense and space division includes the part purchased from Rockwell (ROK) in 1986 and is based at the former McDonnell facility in St. Louis, and is responsible for defense and space products and services.  McDonnell Douglas's legacy product programs include the F-15 Eagle, AV-8B Harrier II, F/A-18 Hornet, and F/A-18E/F Super Hornet.

Products

Aircraft

Crewed Spacecraft
 Mercury capsule
 Gemini capsule
 ASSET spaceplane

Missiles and others
 ADM-20 Quail
 LBD Gargoyle
 TD2D/KDD/KDH Katydid target drone, 1942

Aircraft engines
 PJ42 pulse-jet engine

Selected projects
McDonnell HRH, two engine compound gyroplane transport for US Marine Corps, 1950
McDonnell HCH, two engine heavy-lift helicopter for US Navy, 1952
McDonnell 188, four engine short takeoff and landing (STOL) transport, proposed licensed production of Bréguet 941, 1961

See also
 Sanford N. McDonnell, nephew of founder and later President (1971), CEO (1972) and Chair (1980) of McDonnell Douglas.

References

Footnotes

Notes

Bibliography

 Francillon, René J. McDonnell Douglas Aircraft since 1920. London:Putnam, 1979. .

External links

 McDonnell Aircraft history 1939-45
 McDonnell Aircraft history 1946-56
 McDonnell Aircraft history 1957-67
 McDonnell Gemini Space Program 1963-1966
 List of all McDonnell model numbers through 1974

 
Defunct aircraft manufacturers of the United States
Defunct helicopter manufacturers of the United States
McDonnell Douglas mergers and acquisitions
American companies established in 1939
Manufacturing companies established in 1939
Manufacturing companies disestablished in 1967
1939 establishments in Missouri
1967 mergers and acquisitions
1967 disestablishments in Missouri
Technology companies disestablished in 1967
Technology companies established in 1939
Defunct manufacturing companies based in Missouri